Venetta Lee Fields (born 1941) is an American-born singer and musical theater actress, and  vocal coach. 

Venetta was a backing vocalist for touring American and British rock and pop acts of the 1960s and 1970s, as well as working as a session recording vocalist, she works with such artists including Ike & Tina Turner, Pink Floyd, Humble Pie, Barbra Streisand, Elkie Brooks, Neil Diamond, Steely Dan, Bob Seger, and the Rolling Stones. After emigrating to Australia in 1982, she took up citizenship. She recorded or toured as a backing singer for Australian artists Richard Clapton, Australian Crawl, Cold Chisel, Jimmy Barnes, James Morrison and John Farnham.

Life and career

Early life 
Fields was born in Buffalo, New York in 1941, into a religious family. Her early musical training was from regular gospel performances at church. Her inspiration was Aretha Franklin. Fields singing career began with the Templaires, a group she formed with members of her church, followed by the Corinthian Gospel Singers.

Early career 

In late 1961, the Ike & Tina Turner Revue were playing in Buffalo. Fields successfully auditioned as a new member of Ike & Tina Turner's backing vocalists, joining the Ikettes. The revue toured the Chitlin' Circuit and performed at prominent theaters in major cities across the United States. In between gigs Ike Turner produced artists in the revue. Fields released her debut single "You're Still My Baby"/ "I'm Leaving You" on Turner's Sony Records label in 1963. Fields was given a solo to perform during shows, such as "The Love of My Man" on the album Ike & Tina Turner Revue Live (1964), "I Know (You Don't Love Me No More)," and "Good Time Tonight" on Live! The Ike & Tina Turner Show (1965).

In 1965, the Ikettes released the Top 40 hit "Peaches 'N' Cream" (Pop #36, R&B #28) and "I'm So Thankful" (Pop #74, R&B #12) on Modern Records. By late 1965, Fields left the revue along with fellow Ikettes Jessie Smith and Robbie Montgomery. Fields later recalled "I was an Ikette for five years. It was a rough job, but it was a very good experience. It's just like a school. You go from grade 1 to 2, not from 1 to 8. And when you graduate you have to leave. There is such a thing as staying too long; when you start getting stagnant and stifled by what you're doing. We almost stayed too long."

In 1966, the trio signed to Mirwood Records and became the Mirettes. They left Mirwood and released their highest charting single "In the Midnight Hour" (Pop #45, R&B #18) on Revue Records in 1968. By 1970, Fields had left the group and was replaced by former Ikette Pat Powdrill.

Session vocalist 

Fields worked as a session vocalist from about 1969, often with Clydie King and Sherlie Matthews, for Quincy Jones, Paul Butterfield, Tim Buckley, Steely Dan, Joe Walsh, Joe Cocker, Elkie Brooks, Neil Diamond, Leonard Cohen, Bob Seger, Burt Bacharach and Burton Cummings. 

Others include: Diana Ross, Bette Midler, Bob Dylan, the Supremes, and for Aretha Franklin – her mentor and inspiration. Notable performances during this time included Wish You Were Here (September 1975) with Pink Floyd, and recording the Rolling Stones' album Exile on Main St. (May 1972). Fields later reflected on her sessions for the latter album, they were at midnight but she wanted money for clothing, "I was more interested in the coat than I was in the Rolling Stones". With King, she sang on four tracks, "Tumbling Dice", "I Just Want to See His Face", "Let It Loose" and "Shine a Light", which she felt "were wonderful songs and they were just right for us... We knew gospel. That's what most people wanted from us, a gospel sound."

Around 1971, Fields, King, and Matthews formed the Blackberries, with Matthews as producer and songwriter as well as vocalist. When backing Ray Charles, the trio worked as the Raelettes. In 1972 Steve Marriott asked them to record and tour with his band, Humble Pie, and produced an unreleased Blackberries LP with Humble Pie as the backing band – they parted company in 1973. Michael Little of Vinyl District reviewed Eat It (April 1973), which showed Humble Pie "at its most eclectic. Each of its four sides emphasized a different aspect of the band, and the concept works." He described the track, "Get Down to It", which "makes maximum use of the band’s backing singers" including "the immortal" Fields. Fields and King acted as Barbra Streisand's backing singers (The Oreos) in the 1976 musical film, A Star Is Born (December 1976), and sang on its associated film soundtrack (November 1976). Fields had previously sung on two of Streisand's albums from 1971.

Career in Australia

As a member of Boz Scaggs backing band, Fields toured Australia in 1978 and 1980. While in the country in the latter year she contributed backing vocals to Marc Hunter's (ex-Dragon) solo album, Big City Talk. Back in the US she provided backing vocals for So Lucky (December 1981), by Renée Geyer – the Australian artist was then working in California. Fields decided to relocate permanently to Australia in 1982, "I had all that experience and a good reputation but I felt like I was stuck in a stereotyped box... I needed to do something else and I had to get away to somewhere where I could start again."

Fields continued to work with US artists when they toured her adopted country until 2000, including George Benson, Dionne Warwick, Streisand, Thelma Houston, and Randy Crawford. She also recorded or toured as a backing singer with Australian artists, Richard Clapton (1983–84), Jimmy Barnes, Australian Crawl, Cold Chisel, James Morrison, Mark Gillespie (Australian singer), and as a long-term touring and session harmony vocalist for John Farnham (1986–95). Neil Lade of The Canberra Times reviewed Clapton's album, Solidarity (September 1984), and described its final track, "New World", as "slow and softly lulling. A song of peace and hope... and Clapton's voice is at its tuneful best. And the backing vocals of Vanetta [sic] Fields add a powerful and echoing dimension to what may be just the album's finest song."

In the mid-1980s in Melbourne, Fields formed a new group, Venetta's Taxi, with a line-up including vocalist Sherlie Matthews, guitarist Michael den Elzen, and Chong Lim on keyboards, while also performing regularly as a backing vocalist for local and touring artists. During this period Fields coached singing, including Karen Knowles and Colette Mann, at Tony Bartuccio's Dance Academy in Prahran. She took vocal workshops at the Victorian College of the Arts.

Fields and Farnham were both guest vocalists with The Incredible Penguins in late 1985, for a cover of "Happy Xmas (War Is Over)", a charity project for research on little penguins, which peaked at No. 10 on the Australian Kent Music Report in December. Fields starting work for Farnham on his Jack's Back Tour in support of his album, Whispering Jack (October 1986). Debbie Kruger of Variety magazine caught the show at the State Theater in March 1987, "Midway through the show, Farnham left the stage, and backing Singer Venetta Fields sang three songs which kept the audience warm but eager for more of their hero."

Musical theatre
In January 1989 Fields made her musical theater debut as Alice in the Australian production of Big River: The Adventures of Huckleberry Finn at Her Majesty's Theatre, Sydney. She followed with other stage appearances including two plays for the Melbourne Theatre Company – Racing Demon (April 1991) and The Crucible (May 1991) – Blues in the Night (August, October 1992), Chess (concert version), and as Ruby in the Buddy Holly show Buddy the Musical. In 1986 she formed and toured her own show, Gospel Jubilee; the line-up of the band of the same name was Joanne Campbell, Joe Creighton, Chong Lim, Sherlie Mathews and Fellon Williams.

Later years
Fields has lived on the Gold Coast since 2000 and no longer tours or records with visiting artists. She released her solo album At Last in 2005.

Fields is active as a vocal coach with several students including 2005 Australian Idol winner Kate DeAraugo, singer-songwriter Cody Simpson, and 2011 Australia's Got Talent, finalist Bree De Rome.

Accolades
In 2002, Fields received the Australian Gospel Singer of the Year award.

In recognition of her achievements, Fields was inducted into the Buffalo Music Hall of Fame on September 29, 2005.

Selected discography

Singles 

 1963: "You're Still My Baby"/ "I'm Leaving You" (Sony 112)

Albums

 1976: The Dupars Featuring Venetta Fields – Love Cookin' - We Rockin (Grit Records)
 1999: At Last (Drumlake Pty. Ltd.)

Featured as an Ikette or Mirette 

 1964: Ike & Tina Turner Revue Live (Kent Records)
 1965: Live! The Ike & Tina Turner Show (Warner Bros. Records)
 1966: Soul the Hits (Modern Records)
 1968: In The Midnight Hour (Revue Records)
 1969: Whirlpool (Uni Records)
 1992: Fine Fine Fine (Kent Records)
 2007: Can't Sit Down... 'Cos It Feels So Good: The Complete Modern Recordings (Kent Records)
 2012: Ike Turner Studio Productions New Orleans And Los Angeles 1963-1965 (Ace Records)

Backing vocal credits

 1969: Quincy Jones – The Lost Man (soundtrack) 
 1970: Neil Diamond – Gold: Recorded Live at the Troubadour
 1970: Fever Tree – For Sale 
 1970: Paul Butterfield – Live 
1971: Paul Butterfield – Sometimes I Just Feel Like Smilin 
 1971: Barbra Streisand – Stoney End 
1971: Barbra Streisand – Barbra Joan Streisand 
 1971: Graham Nash – Songs for Beginners 
 1971: Spirit – Feedback 
 1972: The Rolling Stones – Exile on Main St. 
 1972: The Doors – Full Circle 
 1972: Tim Buckley – Greetings from L.A.
 1972: Steely Dan – Can't Buy a Thrill 
 1973: Humble Pie – Eat It 
 1973: Diana Ross – "Touch Me in the Morning"
 1973: Joe Walsh – The Smoker You Drink, the Player You Get 
 1973: Pink Floyd – Dark Side of the Moon Tour 
 1973: Sonny Terry & Brownie McGhee – Sonny & Brownie 
 1974: Humble Pie – Thunderbox 
 1974: Joe Cocker – I Can Stand a Little Rain 
 1974: Gene Clark – No Other 
1974: Tim Buckley – Look at the Fool 
1975: Humble Pie – Street Rats
1975: Joe Cocker – Jamaica Say You Will 
1975: Pink Floyd – Wish You Were Here 
 1975: The Doobie Brothers – Stampede 
 1975: Elkie Brooks – Rich Man's Woman
 1975: Bonnie Raitt – Home Plate 
 1976: Neil Diamond – Beautiful Noise
 1976: Steely Dan - The Royal Scam
 1977: Alice Cooper – Lace and Whiskey 
 1977: Leonard Cohen – Death of a Ladies' Man 
 1977: Steely Dan – Aja 
 1978: Dr. John – Hollywood Be Thy Name 
 1978: Bob Seger – Stranger in Town 
 1978: Burton Cummings – Dream of a Child 
 1978: Chuck Girard – Take It Easy 
 1978: Neil Diamond – You Don't Bring Me Flowers 
 1978: Jean Terrell – I Had to Fall in Love 
 1979: Elkie Brooks – Live and Learn 
 1979: Burt Bacharach – Together?
 1979: Neil Diamond – September Morn
 1980: Boz Scaggs – Middle Man 
 1982: Tim Finn – Escapade 
 1984: Richard Clapton – Solidarity 
 1984: Jimmy Barnes – Bodyswerve
 1988: John Farnham – Age of Reason 
 1989: Richard Clapton – The Best Years of Our Lives
 1990: John Farnham – Chain Reaction 

Credits at AllMusic

References

External links
Buffalo Hall of Fame article on Fields
Humble-Pie.net: The Blackberries & Humble Pie

Living people
1941 births
Voice teachers
African-American women singers
American expatriates in Australia
American soul singers
Ike & Tina Turner members
Naturalised citizens of Australia
Singers from New York (state)
Musicians from Buffalo, New York
American rhythm and blues singers
Australian musical theatre actresses
The Blackberries members